Berești-Tazlău is a commune in Bacău County, Western Moldavia, Romania. It is composed of seven villages: Berești-Tazlău, Boșoteni, Enăchești, Prisaca, Românești, Tescani, and Turluianu.

Natives
 Maria Tescanu Rosetti

References

Communes in Bacău County
Localities in Western Moldavia